Henry Buckingham (May 28, 1830 – January 25, 1916) was an American newspaper publisher and community promoter in Cloud County, Kansas. He is widely regarded as being the first to publish a newspaper in the county and makes that claim  in an article written by him that was published in 1894. The paper he founded, The Republican Valley Empire was the forerunner to the current publication the Concordia Blade-Empire, a daily newspaper published in Concordia, Kansas.

Buckingham, who was originally from Huron County, Ohio, was also instrumental in bringing railroad lines to Cloud County, serving on the board of the Republican Valley Railway Company.

References

 Bell, Rachel Lowrey (1998).  A Proud Past... A Pictorial History of Concordia
 Buckingham, Henry, A Brief Account of the Establishment of the First Paper in the Republican and Solomon Valleys, Concordia Empire, June 14, 1894. Kansas, Marceline, Missouri: D-Books Publishing.
 Emery, Janet Pease (1970). It Takes People to Make a Town, Salina, Kansas: Arrow Printing Company. Library of Congress number 75-135688.

External links

1830 births
1916 deaths
People from Huron County, Ohio
People from Concordia, Kansas
19th-century American newspaper publishers (people)
Editors of Kansas newspapers